Conestoga Mall is an enclosed shopping mall in Grand Island, Nebraska. It was opened in 1974 and is owned by Namdar Realty Group. The mall's anchor store is Best Buy. There are 4 vacant anchor stores that were once Sears, Dillard's, Younkers and JCPenney.

History
Ericson Development of Edina, Minnesota, built the mall in 1974. At the time, it included Miller & Paine and Brandeis as its anchors. Later expansions brought Sears and JCPenney as anchors, as well as regional department store chain J.M. McDonald.

Dillard's purchased Miller & Paine in 1988, and Younkers purchased Brandeis in 1987. Best Buy serves as a junior anchor, located in part of the former J.M. McDonald space.

In 2003, J. Herzog & Sons bought the mall from the Richard E. Jacobs group, which had put it up for sale in 1999. In 2017, New York-Based Namdar Realty Group purchased the mall.

The Younkers store closed in August 2018 with the liquidation of its owner, Bon-Ton Stores. The mall's Sears location closed in early 2019 as part of the retailer's plan to close 40 stores. On June 4, 2020, it was announced that JCPenney would be closing around October 2020 as part of a plan to close 154 stores nationwide.On February 1, 2023 it was announced that Dillard's would be closing their location at the mall leaving it with only Best Buy as the remaining anchor.

References

Shopping malls in Nebraska
Shopping malls established in 1974
Namdar Realty Group